Charles Afuakwah (born 27 June 1966 in Ghana) is a Ghanaian-born Scottish former rugby union player who played for Glasgow Rugby, now Glasgow Warriors at the Lock position.

Rugby Union career

Amateur career

Before professionalism he played for Glasgow Academicals RFC.

He played for newly merged team Glasgow Hawks from 1997 while he still played with the professional Glasgow side.

Provincial and professional career

He played for the provincial Glasgow District side before it became professional as Glasgow Warriors.

When the provincial side professionalised in 1996, Afuakwah was the starting Lock in Glasgow's European Rugby Challenge Cup match against French side AS Montferrand. He has the Glasgow Warrior No. 24.

Afuakwah played for Glasgow in the European Cup matches against Ulster Rugby and London Wasps in season 1997-98. Glasgow won against Ulster Rugby but was beaten by Wasps.

He left Glasgow to solely play for amateur side Glasgow Hawks RFC in 1998 on Glasgow's merger with Caledonia Reds.

Administrative career

He is now President of the Glasgow Hawks club.

Dental career

Outwith rugby, Afuakwah is now a dentist practising at Crosshill Dental Practice in Port Glasgow.

External links 

EPC profile
Golden try rule
 Statbunker

References 

1966 births
Living people
Glasgow Warriors players
Scottish rugby union players
Glasgow Hawks players
Glasgow Academicals rugby union players
Place of birth missing (living people)
Rugby union locks